Leninsky District is an administrative subdivision of the city of Minsk, Belarus. It was named after Vladimir Lenin.

Geography
The district is situated in the south-central area of the city and borders with Tsentralny, Partyzanski, Zavodski, Kastrychnitski and Maskowski districts.

Transport
Lieninski is served by subway and tram networks. It is also crossed by the MKAD beltway.

See also
Dinamo Stadium

References

External links
 Leninsky District official website

Districts of Minsk